George Lloyd (1560– 1 August 1615) was born in Wales, and became Bishop of Sodor and Man, then Bishop of Chester. He is remembered for Bishop Lloyd's House in Chester, which he had built in the years before his death, and which is recorded in the National Heritage List for England as a designated Grade I listed building.

Family and education
Lloyd was born in 1560 at Bryn Euryn, Llandrillo yn Rhos in Wales. His father was Meredith Lloyd of Llanelian-yn-Rhos, Denbighshire, and his mother Jonet Conwy.

He was educated at the King's School, Chester from 1575-1579. He then entered Jesus College, Cambridge. There he received his B.A. in 1583, M.A. in 1586, B.D. in 1593, and finally his Doctor of Divinity in 1598.

He married Anne Wilkenson in 1594 and they had six children who lived to adulthood.

His daughter Anne married Thomas Yale, whose son David was father of Elihu Yale, benefactor of the college now named for him.  Anne married secondly Theophilus Eaton, merchant, diplomat, and, later, one of the founders and the first governor of the New Haven Colony.  The Eatons emigrated to New England in 1637, aboard the Hector of London.

Ministry 
Lloyd became a Fellow of Magdalene College, Cambridge around 1586. He was ordained as a curate for the church of St Peter Mancroft in Norwich by Bishop Edmund Scrambler of Norwich in January 1591.

He was rector of Llanrwst, and later that same year, rector of Heswall, Cheshire from 1597.

Bishop of Sodor and Man 
He was consecrated as Bishop of Sodor and Man in 1600. Although this bishopric was not a lucrative one, and he even commented on the "smallness of the Bishopricke". Despite this, the appointment was a significant promotion and stepping stone to a more prominent position in England. Like most of his predecessors, Lloyd rarely visited the Isle of Man and there is only one recorded visit in 1603 where he attended a Consistory Court where several offenders against the spiritual law were punished. Although Lloyd did have a bishop's palace on the Isle of Man, some twenty miles north of the cathedral at Peel, he significantly refurbished a fashionable townhouse at Watergate Street in Chester.

Bishop of Chester 
In 1605 he exchanged the seat of Sodor and Man for that of Chester, the Chester Cathedral and was consecrated in January. A former lecturer at Chester Cathedral, he was tolerant of Puritan views in his diocese. During his tenure as Bishop of Chester, he reversed the anti-Puritan policies of his predecessor Richard Vaughan. In local politics, he opposed Robert Whitby, a nominee of Lord Ellesmere as clerk of the Pentice, who was building a family factional position in the city.

He died 1 August 1615, and was buried in Chester cathedral, where he is commemorated by a mural inscription. In the year of his death he bought Pant Iocyn, near Wrexham, formerly the residence of the Almer family, which remained the home of his family till 1634.

Notes

External links
Welsh Biography Online
Chester Grosvenor Museum's delighted at bishop purchase

1561 births
1615 deaths
Bishops of Sodor and Man
Bishops of Chester
Alumni of Jesus College, Cambridge
Fellows of Magdalene College, Cambridge
16th-century Welsh Anglican priests
17th-century Church of England bishops
People educated at The King's School, Chester